Vypasnoy is a rural locality (a settlement) and the administrative center of Vypasnovskoye Rural Settlement, Kotelnikovsky District, Volgograd Oblast, Russia. The population was 864 as of 2010. There are 13 streets.

Geography 
Vypasnoy is located 37 km east of Kotelnikovo (the district's administrative centre) by road. Poperechny is the nearest rural locality.

References 

Rural localities in Kotelnikovsky District